Untitled (African-American Flag) is a vexillographic artwork by  David Hammons from 1990, combining the colors of the Pan-African flag with the pattern of the flag of the United States to represent African American identity.

It was first created for the art exhibition "Black USA" at an Amsterdam museum in 1990, and its first edition was of five flags, which are now in major museum collections. 

The work's creation has been seen in the context of the inauguration of David Dinkins as the first African American mayor of New York City, following his 1989 election. The following year Hammons was awarded the MacArthur Genius Fellowship for his "contributions to African American cultural identity".

Collections and galleries 
The original series was of five flags, these are sometimes known as the 'Amsterdam flags'. The original series was followed by another series of ten. 

The original series flags include the versions in the collections of:
 Museum of Modern Art, New York, (2 versions, 1 shared with the Studio Museum in Harlem)
 The Broad, Los Angeles
 National Museum of African American History and Culture, Smithsonian Institution, Washington, DC
 The Collection Over Holland

The work is also in following collections but it is unclear when they were created:
 Jack Shainman Gallery
 The New School, New York
 Pizzuti collection, Columbus, Ohio

Display and symbolism 

Since 2004 the Studio Museum Harlem has flown its version of the artwork above its entrance in Harlem, New York.

Replicas of Hammon's flag are frequently flown social justice protests and demonstrations.

See also 

Ethnic flag

References

Flags introduced in 1990
1990 in art
Flags in art
Flags of the United States
Ethnic flags
African-American culture
Works_by_David_Hammons